Jan Petersen (born 1946) is a Norwegian politician.

Jan Petersen may also refer to:

 Jan Petersen (historian) (1887–1967), Norwegian archaeologist
 Jan Petersen (cyclist) (born 1970), Danish Olympic cyclist

See also
 Jann Petersen (born 1984), Faroese football
 Jan Peterson (born 1937), Canadian writer
 Jan Pedersen (born 1962), Speedway rider
 Jan Peters (disambiguation)